Grand Parade can refer to:

 Grand Parade (Brighton), England
 Grand Parade (Cape Town), South Africa
 Grand Parade, Cork, Republic of Ireland
 Grand Parade (Gibraltar)
 Grand Parade (Halifax), Nova Scotia
 Grand Parade, a section of Green Lanes (London), Harringay
 Grand Parade (horse), the winner of the 1919 Epsom Derby
 Grand Parade, a 1997 album by the Frank and Walters
 The Grand Parade, a 1930 American film